The 1998 K League was the 16th season of South Korean professional football league, and was the first season to have been named the "K League". This season is called the "Renaissance of K League" in South Korea. Despite the poor performance of South Korean national team at the 1998 FIFA World Cup, the 1998 season of K League recorded a total of 2 million spectators with young star players' popularity for the first time. The three most popular players of them Ko Jong-soo, Lee Dong-gook, and Ahn Jung-hwan were called the "K League Troika".

Regular season

Championship playoffs

Bracket

Final table

Awards

Main awards

Best XI

Source:

See also
 1998 K League Championship
 1998 Korean League Cup
 1998 Korean League Cup (Supplementary Cup)
 1998 Korean FA Cup

References

External links
 RSSSF

K League seasons
1
South Korea
South Korea